Ostorhinchus hoevenii is a species of ray-finned fish from the family Apogonidae, the cardinalfishes, it is from the Indo-West Pacific north to Japan and south to Australia. It occasionally makes its way into the aquarium trade. It grows to a size of 6 cm in length. It occurs in small groups among corals, sea urchins, crinoids and algae. The specific name honours the Dutch zoologist Jan van der Hoeven (1801-1868).

References

External links
 

hoevenii
Fish described in 1854